Gabriel José Gomes Faria (born 1 August 1994 in Barcelos) known as Gaby, is a Portuguese footballer who plays for Gil Vicente F.C. as a defender.

Football career
On 2 August 2015, Gaby made his professional debut with Gil Vicente in a 2015–16 Taça da Liga match against Académico Viseu.

References

External links

1994 births
Living people
Portuguese footballers
Association football defenders
Gil Vicente F.C. players
People from Barcelos, Portugal
Sportspeople from Braga District